Assjack is an American heavy metal band led by Hank Williams III and Garrett Bremer. The band is one of the three incarnations of Williams' live show.

Career
For Assjack's long-anticipated 2009 self-titled studio debut, only Williams sang and played all instruments on the recording.

For live purposes, the band features Gary Lindsey on vocals, Hank Williams III on guitar and vocals, and Joe Buck who used to be on bass but is now focused on his solo career. Assjack has had a revolving drum slot and background vocalist slot throughout the years. On recent tours, Chris Arp has played lead guitar.

Hank III confirmed in a November 10, 2009 interview that no new Assjack material is in the works because of being held back by Curb Records so long. Hank III also stated that after Curb is dropped (after the release of his 2010 solo album Rebel Within) that he would be taking his music and Assjack's music to the next level.

Musical style
Their musical style has been described as thrash metal, death metal, hardcore punk, and metalcore.

Discography

Studio albums

Singles

Music videos

Members

Current members
 Hank Williams III – vocals, guitar
 Gary Lindsey – co-vocals for the Damn Band and Assjack
 Garrett Bremer – drums

Touring and former members
 Christopher Arp (Psyopus) – guitar
 Kevin Bond – guitar
 Zach Shedd – bass
 Joe Fazzio – drums
 Brian Poskochil – co-vocals
 Tim Yeung (Hate Eternal / Vital Remains) – drums
 Munesh Sami – drums
 Joe Buck – bass
 Grahm Reynolds – guitar

References

External links
Hank Williams III & Assjack official website

1999 establishments in California
Metalcore musical groups from California
Gridley, California
Hardcore punk groups from California
Death metal musical groups from California
Musical groups established in 1999
Thrash metal musical groups from California